The 2007 LPGA Championship was played from June 7–10 at Bulle Rock Golf Course in Havre de Grace, Maryland. This was the 53rd edition of the LPGA Championship, the second of four major championships on the LPGA Tour in 2007.

Suzann Pettersen, age 26, won her first major title with 274 (−14), one stroke ahead of runner-up Karrie Webb; it was her second career win on the LPGA Tour.

Past champions in the field

Made the cut

Source:

Missed the cut

Source:

Round summaries

First round
Thursday, June 7, 2007

Second round
Friday, June 8, 2007

Third round
Saturday, June 9, 2007

Final round
Sunday, June 10, 2007

Source:

Scorecard
Final round

Cumulative tournament scores, relative to par
{|class="wikitable" span = 50 style="font-size:85%;
|-
|style="background: Red;" width=10|
|Eagle
|style="background: Pink;" width=10|
|Birdie
|style="background: PaleGreen;" width=10|
|Bogey
|}

References

External links
Golf Observer leaderboard

Women's PGA Championship
Golf in Maryland
LPGA Championship
LPGA Championship
LPGA Championship
LPGA Championship